Emmitt H. Ford (December 13, 1943 – November 10, 2014) was an American politician from Tennessee. He represented the 86th district encompassing Shelby County from 1975–1981. He was also an uncle of former United States Congressman Harold Ford Jr.

Early life
Ford was one of twelve children born to N. J. and Vera Ford. Growing up in the West Junction and  Riverside neighborhoods of South Memphis, he graduated from Geeter High School. Also, he attended Tennessee State University.

Political career and legal problems
He succeeded his brother Harold Ford Sr. as representative, but resigned in 1981 after a conviction for fraud. Rufus E. Jones was named to Ford's seat. Ford was sentenced to federal prison in 2000 for tax evasion.

Life after politics
For over twenty years, he operated a meat market in South Memphis. He died at Methodist Hospital in Memphis, Tennessee on November 10, 2014.

References

1943 births
2014 deaths
American politicians convicted of fraud
Tennessee State University alumni
Ford family of Tennessee
Democratic Party members of the Tennessee House of Representatives
Politicians from Memphis, Tennessee
African-American state legislators in Tennessee
Tennessee politicians convicted of crimes
20th-century African-American people
21st-century African-American people